The 2015–16 San Diego Toreros women's basketball team will represent the University of San Diego in the 2015–16 college basketball season. The Toreros, members of the West Coast Conference, are led by head coach Cindy Fisher, in her eleventh season at the school. The Toreros play their home games at the Jenny Craig Pavilion on the university campus in San Diego, California. They finished the season 25–8, 13–5 in WCC play to finish in a tie for third place. They lost in the quarterfinals of the WCC women's tournament to San Francisco. They were invited to the Women's National Invitation Tournament where they defeated Northwestern and IUPUI in the first and rounds before losing to Michigan in the third round.

Roster

Schedule

|-
!colspan=9 style="background:#002654; color:#97CAFF;"| Exhibition

|-
!colspan=9 style="background:#002654; color:#97CAFF;"| Non-conference regular season

|-
!colspan=9 style="background:#002654; color:#97CAFF;"| WCC regular season

|-
!colspan=9 style="background:#002654; color:#97CAFF;"| WCC Women's Tournament

|-
!colspan=9 style="background:#002654; color:#97CAFF;"| WNIT

Rankings
2015–16 NCAA Division I women's basketball rankings

References

San Diego
San Diego Toreros women's basketball seasons
2016 Women's National Invitation Tournament participants